In enzymology, a 1-phosphatidylinositol-5-phosphate 4-kinase is an enzyme that catalyzes the chemical reaction

ATP + 1-phosphatidyl-1D-myo-inositol 5-phosphate  ADP + 1-phosphatidyl-1D-myo-inositol 4,5-bisphosphate

Thus, the two substrates of this enzyme are ATP and 1-phosphatidyl-1D-myo-inositol 5-phosphate, whereas its two products are ADP and 1-phosphatidyl-1D-myo-inositol 4,5-bisphosphate.

This enzyme belongs to the family of transferases, specifically those transferring phosphorus-containing groups (phosphotransferases) with an alcohol group as acceptor.  The systematic name of this enzyme class is ATP:1-phosphatidyl-1D-myo-inositol-5-phosphate 4-phosphotransferase. This enzyme is also called type II PIP kinase.  This enzyme participates in 3 metabolic pathways: inositol phosphate metabolism, phosphatidylinositol signaling system, and regulation of actin cytoskeleton.

References

 

EC 2.7.1
Enzymes of unknown structure